Mattias Tesfaye (born 31 March 1981 in Aarhus) is a Danish politician serving as Minister for Education and Children since 2022. He was previously Minister for Justice from February to December 2022 and Minister for Immigration and Integration from 2019 to 2022, and has been member of the Folketing since the 2015 Danish general election as a member of the Social Democrats.

Background
He was born in Aarhus in 1981 to Tesfaye Momo (an Ethiopian refugee) and Jytte Svensson, and is currently married to Signe Hagel Andersen. The couple has two children.

Political career
Before he joined the Social Democrats in 2015 Tesfaye was a prominent member and former vice chairman of the Socialist People's Party. He has also previously been a member of both the Red–Green Alliance and the now defunct Communist Party of Denmark/Marxist–Leninists. He was elected member of Folketinget for the Social Democrats in 2015. 

Tesfayer was appointed Minister for Immigration and Integration in the Frederiksen Cabinet on 27 June 2019. Under his leadership, Denmark’s government approached countries both in and outside the European Union about a potential asylum deal, including Tunisia and Ethiopia. Denmark also signed a diplomatic agreement with Rwanda on asylum and political matters.

Political positions
On the right for asylum, Tesfaye has a very restrictive position, setting the goal of having "no asylum seekers any more at all". The Social Democrats in Denmark push for stricter immigration laws, and the party talks about certain neighbourhoods as "ghettos" based on set jobless quotas, above-average criminality, lower-than-average levels of education and income, and the presence of people with non-Western backgrounds.

References

External links 
 Biography on the website of the Danish Parliament (Folketinget)

People from Aarhus
1981 births
Living people
Government ministers of Denmark
Social Democrats (Denmark) politicians
Danish people of Ethiopian descent
Members of the Folketing 2015–2019
Members of the Folketing 2019–2022